TVS Jupiter is a variomatic scooter launched in September 2013 by India's TVS Motor Company. The launch of the scooter marked the company's entry into the part of the market that mainly targets females. This Variomatic Scooter is launched as a rival for Honda Activa.

It is powered by a single-cylinder, four-stroke,  engine and delivers 5.88 kW (7.88 bhp) at 7,500 rpm. The scooter delivers a pick-up of 0 to 60 km/h in 11.2 seconds. The scooter has an 'Econometer' and has a fuel efficiency of 49 kmpl, per the manufacturer.

In July 2018, TVS Jupiter crossed the 2.5 million unit sales mark and became the second most sold scooter in India.
On 7th October 2021, TVS Launched the 125cc Variant of Jupiter in order to compete TVS Ntorq, Honda Activa 125 and Suzuki Access 125. and uses an all new 124.8 cc engine.

Awards
In 2014, the NDTV Car & Bike Awards named the TVS Jupiter the Scooter of the Year. The TVS Jupiter also won awards from BBC Top Gear India and Bike India, which named it the Scooter of the Year, making it the most awarded scooter in India.
It also won the award for Excellence in Branding & Marketing at the 5th CMO Asia Awards by World Brand Congress. TVS reached 500,000 scooters on the road in 18 months, which is a record in the Indian two-wheeler industry.

Special Edition
In 2015, TVS Motor Company launched a new limited volume variant of the Jupiter, called the TVS Jupiter Scooter-of-the-Year Special Edition, created to celebrate the TVS Jupiter being named Scooter of the Year 2014 in India.

TVS has successfully launched many models, such as the TVS Jupiter ZX, TVS Jupiter Classic, and the most recent TVS Jupiter Grande.

References

External links 

Indian motor scooters
TVS motorcycles
Motorcycles introduced in 2013